The British Orienteering Federation Limited, generally known and branded as British Orienteering, is the national sports governing body for the sport of orienteering in the United Kingdom.

The federation was founded in June 1967, and is a member of the IOF.

History

History of Orienteering in UK before the BOF 
Orienteering was introduced to the UK in the 1950s and was heavily supported by renowned Olympians including John Disley and Chris Brasher. The early years were helped by orienteers from Sweden: in 1962 Baron 'Rak' Largerfelt of the Stockholm Orienteering Club came to Scotland to help develop the sport. This culminated in the first championship being held in May 1962 at Dunkeld, and the formation of the Scottish Orienteering Association.

Later visitors from Sweden included Jan Kjellström, a son of Silva compass founder Alvar Kjellström. Kjellström played an important role in the development of the sport and helped to accelerate developments in orienteering competition, mapping and coaching. Kjellström died in a road accident early in the year of 1967.
1967 saw the first Jan Kjellström International Festival of Orienteering or "JK", held in memory of Kjellström. Later that year the British Orienteering Federation was formed by the amalgamation of the English and Scottish Associations leading to the first British Orienteering Championships held at Hamsterley Forest.

After the Founding of BOF 
With the growth of the sport BOF was founded in 1967, and continued to develop. There were 12 national and regional associations by 1972; the British Schools Orienteering Association joining in 1995 when it was formed to promote orienteering in schools. The Federation's membership had reached around 10,000 by 1998 and the club membership had increased to more 150 clubs.

Structure 
The federation is made up of thirteen constituent associations, one each for Scotland, Wales, and Northern Ireland; nine for the English regions; and the British Schools Orienteering Association. The nine English regions are also Members of the English Orienteering Council (EOC).

The associations are:

Funding 
Funding is principally from three sources:
 Fees paid by individual members and clubs
 Event levies paid by events registered with British Orienteering.
 Grant funding from Sport England and Sport Northern Ireland.
Former grant funding from UK Sport has ceased, in common with many other non-Olympic sports.

Governance 
The British Orienteering Federation is governed by a board of directors, and through a number of steering groups appointed by the Board, covering:
 Coaching
 Development
 Events and Competitions
 Talent and Performance
 Trail Orienteering
 Youth Advisory Board
 Welfare and Safeguarding

The board of directors is chaired by Drew Vanbeck. The chief executive is Peter Hart. The board meets about four or five times a year.

See also 
 British orienteers

References 

 
Derbyshire Dales
International Orienteering Federation members
Organisations based in Derbyshire
Sports organizations established in 1967
Orienteering in the United Kingdom
Sport in Derbyshire
Orienteering
1967 establishments in the United Kingdom